Classified Ventures, LLC was a Chicago-based digital media company. The company was established to capitalize on the revenue growth opportunities in the online classified advertising categories of automotive and rentals.  It was a joint venture among six major newspaper publishers: Central Newspapers, A. H. Belo, Gannett Company, The McClatchy Company, Tribune Company, and Graham Holdings Company It was the owner and operator of two leading national online brands: Apartments.com (now part of CoStar Group Inc. NYSE:CSGP) and Cars.com (now NYSE:CARS).

In April 2014, Apartments.com and its associated sites were sold to CoStar Group for $585 million. On August 5, 2014, Gannett announced that it would buy out the other owners' 72% combined stake in Classified Ventures for $1.8 billion, valuing Cars.com at $2.5 billion.  The acquisition was closed on October 1, 2014.  The sale of Apartments.com and Cars.com allowed Classified Ventures to return over $3.5 billion to its owners through a combination of the sales proceeds and dividends paid to its owners in cash or in the form of below market transfer pricing for the sale of digital marketing products sold in its local affiliate newspaper markets.

Don Graham, CEO & Chairman of Graham Holdings Company (NYSE:GHC, formerly the Washington Post Company), wrote the following about Classified Ventures, in their 2014 Annual Report to Shareholders:

"The CV sale deserves some retrospective attention. It was the third of three newspaper-industry joint ventures we invested in during the 1990s. The first two, New Century Network and CareerPath, were expensive failures. One reason was the consortium form of management: each of our partners was a decent company, represented by excellent executives. But disagreements among us all led to slow decision making.

That CV survived and thrived in the face of the same problem was due to the talent and persistence of its CEO Dan Jauernig and an able team of executives and employees, among whom Dick Burke and Mitch Golub were long enduring."

Daniel Jauernig joined Classified Ventures in April, 2000 as Executive Vice President and became CEO in November, 2000.  He was the CEO of Classified Ventures for 14 years until November, 2014 and left shortly after Gannett acquired Cars.com to return to his home city of Toronto, Canada to be closer to his family and join a leading financial services firm.  Through those 14 years Dan and the team at Classified Ventures built both Cars.com and Apartments.com into leading digital marketing brands that employed over 1,500 employees, generated over $600 million in annual network wide revenues and $225 million in EBITDA.

Tegna, Inc., the successor to Gannett's broadcasting and digital properties, spun off Cars.com in May 2017.

References

Online mass media companies of the United States
Defunct companies based in Chicago